Fast & Furious Spy Racers is an American computer-animated streaming television series that premiered on Netflix on December 26, 2019, based on the Fast & Furious film series by Gary Scott Thompson. The series is executive produced by Tim Hedrick, Bret Haaland, Vin Diesel, Neal Moritz, and Chris Morgan. Hedrick and Haaland also serve as the show's showrunners.

The sixth and final season, subtitled Homecoming, was released on December 17, 2021.

Plot 
Tony Toretto, Dominic Toretto's cousin, is recruited by a government agency together with his friends to infiltrate an elite racing league serving as a front for a criminal organization called SH1FT3R that is bent on world domination.

In Season 2, the gang goes to Brazil on an undercover mission to find Layla Gray and prevent potential world domination at the hands of a long-thought deceased daughter of a well-known gang in Rio de Janeiro.

In Season 3, Tony and his crew make a dangerous journey to the Sahara Desert when Ms. Nowhere mysteriously disappears on a mission there, all agents uncovering a plot by a maniacal villain using remote-control weather satellites.

In Season 4, Ms. Nowhere and Tony's crew are framed for a crime they had no involvement in prior, and flee to Mexico to both find the real culprit, clear their names, and flee the unstoppable super-agent hunting them down.

In Season 5, the group travels to the South Pacific Ocean to rescue one of their own, leading to a faceoff with an old enemy.

In Season 6, the team returns to fighting against an old nemesis in a showdown that takes them all the way back to Los Angeles.

Voice cast

Main 

 Tyler Posey as Tony Toretto, the younger cousin of Dominic Toretto. He aspires to be a legend like his cousin.
 Charlet Chung as Margaret "Echo" Pearl, Tony's friend, described as a wildly talented artist and natural spy. She has green hair and ensures that their rides look great, She doesn't like being called by her real name. Echo was inducted into a spy training course by Ms. Nowhere in Season 3, but ultimately finds she'd rather go with following her heart instead of orders.
 Jorge Diaz as Cisco Renaldo, Tony's friend who is also a mechanic, described as the muscle and the sweetheart of the crew. He enjoys food and drink; in one episode, he made sure to install cup holders everywhere in his vehicle.
 Camille Ramsey as Layla Gray, a notable underground racer who worked for SH1FT3R and is Shashi's right-hand woman until she reformed. She prefers to be a lone wolf, and her voice has a Southern twang. Layla was recruited by Ms. Nowhere in Season 2 and has become one of the crew's most reliable allies. She is currently a member of Tony's crew as of Season 3.
 Luke Youngblood as Frostee Benson, Tony's friend, a 13-year old tech genius. He enjoys devising gadgets, flying drones, and hacking into systems. His favorite drink is Yoka and, due to his age, he is the only member of the group without his own car until season 6, when he passes his driving exam and gets his license. Frostee is Youngblood's first voice role.
 Renée Elise Goldsberry as Ms.”Janet” Nowhere, the team's secret agent liaison. She tries to keep Tony and his crew in check and on mission.

 Manish Dayal as Shashi Dhar (main: season 1; guest: season 5), the leader of the SH1FT3R group. The Spy Racers are assigned to stop him after he is suspected to have stolen "keys" from the world's billionaires. Shashi was arrested after season 1. In season 5, he is freed by Ms. Nowhere to help Tony and the others stop Sudarikov's plan. 
 Avrielle Corti as Rafaela Moreno (main: season 2–3; guest: seasons 4 & 6), the daughter of a well known crime lord who despises her current dwelling in Rio and has a mind for world domination with a mind control formula. She was taken into custody after her plans were foiled in the Season 2 finale. After Cleve Kelso broke her out of imprisonment in the beginning of Season 3, Rafaela is currently at large as of the third-season finale until she was arrested at the start of season 4.
India de Beaufort as DANN (season 6), a super intelligent cyborg created by The Agency to help save the world from global threats. Her AI programming later becomes corrupted and now she wants to destroy the world, rather than save it due to global warming.

Recurring and guest stars 

Other actors from the voice acting community have been noted to have supporting parts. They include: Carlos Alazraqui, Eric Bauza, Fred Tatasciore, Grey Griffin, and Kevin Michael Richardson.

Episodes

Series overview

Season 1 (2019)

Season 2: Rio (2020)

Season 3: Sahara (2020)

Season 4: Mexico (2021)

Season 5: South Pacific (2021)

Season 6: Homecoming (2021)

Production
On April 23, 2018, it was announced that Netflix had given the production a series order. Executive producers are set to include Tim Hedrick, Bret Haaland (The Penguins of Madagascar, Kung Fu Panda: Legends of Awesomeness and All Hail King Julien), Vin Diesel, and Chris Morgan. Hedrick and Haaland are also expected to act as showrunners. Productions companies involved with the series include DreamWorks Animation. The series comes after the acquisition of DreamWorks Animation by NBCUniversal which includes a first look at DreamWorks Animation animated series based on Universal Pictures film properties.  Cast members were announced on November 18, 2019.

Release
Fast & Furious Spy Racers was released on Netflix on December 26, 2019. A world premiere red carpet event was held at the Universal Cinema in Los Angeles on December 7. The second season was released on October 9, 2020. 
The third season was released on December 26, 2020. The fourth season was released on April 16, 2021. The fifth season was released on August 13, 2021. The sixth and final season titled as Homecoming was released on December 17, 2021.

Reception
The review aggregator website Rotten Tomatoes reported an 83% approval rating, based on 6 reviews, with an average rating of 7.5/10.

Video game
In May 2021, DreamWorks Animation and Universal announced that a game based on the Netflix series is in the works titled Fast & Furious Spy Racers: Rise of SH1FT3R by 3D Clouds and Outright Games. It was published on November 5, 2021. The game tells an original story separate from the series and has 17 tracks based in locations from the series, including Los Angeles, Rio de Janeiro, the Sahara Desert, and the South Pacific. On April 22, 2022, a DLC pack subtitled "Arctic Challenge" was released, featuring new tracks located in Alaska, four new vehicles, and two additional playable characters.

Notes
 "Ep." is shortened form for episode in the Fast & Furious Spy Racers series

References

External links
 
 
 

2010s American animated television series
2019 American television series debuts
2021 American television series endings
2020s American animated television series
American children's animated action television series
American children's animated adventure television series
American children's animated comedy television series
American children's animated drama television series
American children's animated sports television series
American computer-animated television series
Animated television series about auto racing
Animated television shows based on films
Drones in fiction
English-language Netflix original programming
Fast & Furious mass media
Teen animated television series
Television series by DreamWorks Animation
Television series by Universal Animation Studios
Television series by Universal Television